In 1989, Archie Bleyer's early-1960s Candid Records catalog was bought by Black Lion Productions based in London, which reissued the label's legacy vinyl records into the Compact Disc format, and further adapted its distribution towards music download technology in the succeeding decades. The revitalized Candid Records (UK) subsequently produced new, contemporary jazz recordings to further expand its line.

External links
The Candid Records (UK) official website

References

British jazz
Discographies of British record labels